The 2017 Florida Launch season is the fourth season for the Florida Launch of Major League Lacrosse. The Launch will try to improve upon their franchise and league-worst 3-11 record in 2016. It will be their first season under head coach Tom Mariano after Stan Ross resigned. Due to a renovation to FAU Stadium, the Launch will play their first two home games of the season at Spec Martin Stadium in Deland in partnership with Stetson University.

On July 29, the Launch defeated the Boston Cannons 18-17 to clinch the franchise's first playoff spot and winning record at 8-6. On August 12, Florida's season came to an end in their first ever playoff game, 18-13 to the Ohio Machine.

Schedule

Regular season

Postseason

Standings

References

External links
 Team Website

Major League Lacrosse seasons
Florida Launch